Officer railway station is located on the Pakenham line in Victoria, Australia. It serves the south-eastern Melbourne suburb of Officer, and it opened on 4 August 1881 as Officer's Siding. It was renamed Officer on 13 February 1899.

History

Officer station opened on 4 August 1881, almost four years after the railway line was extended from Dandenong to Pakenham. Like the suburb itself, the station was named after Robert Officer, a local pastoralist. Another theory is that the station and suburb were named after the Officer family, who were originally from Deniliquin, New South Wales.

In 1955, the line between Officer and Pakenham was duplicated and, on 13 May 1956, duplication between Officer and Berwick was provided. In that year, a new station was also provided east of the original site.

In 1976, flashing light signals were provided at the Station Street/Officer South Road level crossing, located nearby in the Up direction of the station. A decade later, in 1986, boom barriers were provided.

On 8 May 1987, a collision involving a Flinders Street bound Comeng train set and V/Line locomotive N457, operating an Up Traralgon service, occurred in the Down direction of the station. 45 people were injured in the collision. Comeng carriage 388M was later scrapped due to the collision, however, part of the carriage was later used as a café in the pedestrian underpass at Werribee.

In 1988, the former goods siding was taken out of service. The main line points leading into the siding were spiked, and were removed at a later date.

Sometime during or after 1995, the present station shelters were provided, replacing timber station buildings.

During the 2011/2012 Financial Year, it was the second least used station on Melbourne's metropolitan system, with 55,000 passenger movements.

On 29 July 2021, the Level Crossing Removal Project announced that the Station Street/Officer South Road level crossing will be closed to vehicle traffic by 2025, and will be replaced with a pedestrian crossing.

Platforms and services

Officer has two side platforms. It is serviced by Metro Trains' Pakenham line services.

Platform 1:
  all stations and limited express services to Flinders Street

Platform 2:
  all stations services to Pakenham

By late 2025, it is planned that trains on the Pakenham line will be through-routed with those on the Sunbury line, via the new Metro Tunnel.

References

External links
 Melway map at street-directory.com.au

Railway stations in Melbourne
Railway stations in Australia opened in 1881
Railway stations in the Shire of Cardinia